The Bayou Bowl is an annual high school football all-star bowl game in which the best graduated seniors from Texas and Louisiana play against each other.  It has been played at Stallworth Stadium in Baytown, Texas, since it began in 2003.

Bowl history
The game was conceived as a join collaboration between leaders in the Baytown-Houston area, including the Baytown/West Chambers County, TX Economic Development Foundation, the President of the Baytown Chamber of Commerce, the incoming chair of the Greater Houston Football Coaches Association and a banker from Amegy Bank in Baytown.

After the initial success in 2003, leaders of the Bayou Bowl decided to donate proceeds to the Shriner's Hospitals for Children in Galveston and Houston.  In 2007, the Bayou Bowl raised $33,000 for the Shriner's Hospitals.  Most of the money was raised by the Bayou Bowl Celebrity Golf Tournament.

Bayou Bowl Celebrity Golf Tournament
Associated with the Bayou Bowl is the Bayou Bowl Celebrity Golf Tournament, which provides a major portion of the fundraising given to the Shriner's Hospitals.  Past celebrities include:
Jim Bierne - Former Houston Oilers wide receiver
Butch Alsandor - KHOU sportscaster
Booker T - WWE wrestler
Ed Biles - Former head coach of the Houston Oilers
Roger Hinshaw - Defensive Coordinator at Lamar University
Calvin Murphy - Pro Basketball Hall of Fame with Houston Rockets
Paul Gaffney - Of the Harlem Globetrotters

Game results

See also
Stallworth Stadium
Baytown, Texas

References

External links
Bayou Bowl official website

High school football games in the United States
High school football in Louisiana
High school sports in Texas 
American football competitions in Louisiana
American football competitions in Texas
Galveston Bay Area
Greater Houston
Baytown, Texas
Recurring sporting events established in 2003
2003 establishments in Texas